Carlo Maria Becchi (born 20 October 1939) is an Italian theoretical physicist.

Becchi studied at the University of Genoa, where he received his university degree in physics in 1962. In 1976, he became full professor for theoretical physics at the University of Genoa. Twice (first in 1983), he was chairman of the physics faculty there. From 1997 to 2003 he was the chairman of the theory committee of the Istituto Nazionale di Fisica Nucleare (INFN).

Becchi began by looking into the photoelectric effect in nuclear physics (topic of his thesis). In the 1960s he worked on quarks and the associated unitary symmetries. Since 1971 he has done work on renormalization theory. Becchi became known for his development around 1975 with Raymond Stora and Alain Rouet of the BRST formalism, which is a method of quantization of systems with secondary conditions like gauge theory. In 2009 as recognition for the BRST formalism, he received the Dannie Heineman Prize for Mathematical Physics with Stora, Rouet, and Igor Tyutin. Since 1991 he is supervisory editor of the journal Nuclear Physics B.

Selected publications
 with Giovanni Ridolfi: Introduction to relativistic processes and the standard model of electroweak interactions, Springer 2005
 with Rouet, Stora: The Abelian Higgs-Kibble-Model. Unitarity of the S-Operator, Physics Letters B, Vol.52, 1974, p. 344

References

External links
 Homepage at the University of Genova with lecture texts and publications list
 Carlo Becchi and Camillo Imbimbo, Becchi-Rouet-Stora-Tyutin symmetry

20th-century Italian physicists
1939 births
Living people
Academic staff of the University of Genoa
Mathematical physicists
21st-century Italian physicists